Deliberative process privilege is the common-law principle that the internal processes of the executive branch of a government are immune from normal disclosure or discovery in civil litigations, Freedom of Information Act requests, etc.

The theory behind the protection is that by guaranteeing confidentiality, the government will receive better or more candid advice, recommendations and opinions, resulting in better decisions for society as a whole.  The deliberative process privilege is often in dynamic tension with the principle of maximal transparency in government.

In the context of the U.S. presidential offices and their workproducts, this principle is often referred to as executive privilege, or as a type of executive privilege that is distinct from "presidential communications privilege".

See also
Public-interest immunity

Evidence law
Secrecy
Administrative law
Privileged communication